The Dhaka World Music Festival also referred to as Dhaka World Music Fest is an international music festival  held in Dhaka, Bangladesh, featuring national and international musicians from different genres. The festival covers an extensive scope of performances from local folk and traditional music genres to world fusion and contemporary world music across the globe. The festival is perceived to be a cardinal platform in Bangladesh to witness the true fusion in the form of world music.

Making 
Inspired by the socio-political impact of music through the Concert for Bangladesh, Runi Khan, the founder of Culturepot Global, a UK based cross-cultural event management organization, intended to stage a major event that would remark the 40th anniversary of that historic concert. Perceiving her country's absence in the global cultural scene, she also had a long cherished desire to fetch world focus on the Bangladeshi music where the Bangladeshi artistes can accentuate the rich culture and heritage of Bangladesh. Impressed by the concept of Runi, Farhan Quddus, head of Excalibur Entertainment, Bangladesh, who was also planning to hold an annual world music programme, joined her. Around the same time, the Bangladesh telecommunication giant, Grameenphone was looking for events that would emphasize the celebration of International Mother Language Day on February 21. Runi's idea of arranging a festival where musicians from all over the world would carry out their traditional music in their mother tongue emerged persuasive for the company. The idea befitted further convincing as the festival would engender Dhaka as a global cultural city. 
Kishon Khan, a London-based British Bangladeshi pianist and composer, also band leader of Lokkhi Terra was instrumental in putting together the festival content as Music Director. His long established relationship with other internationally acclaimed musicians allowed him to draw in some of the best exponents of African and Latin genres of music. Another British Bangladeshi musician, Idris Rahman, also played an important role to interact with some world-reputed bands and musicians to perform at the event.  After cracking a number of bureaucratic and other obstacles, the event finally eventuated on 4–5 February 2011.

Inaugural edition in 2011 
The inaugural edition of the festival took place in 2011 at Sultana Kamal Mohila Krira Complex, in Dhanmondi. It was jointly organized by Culturepot Global UK, Jatrik Travels, Excalibur Entertainment and Symbiance Partners and sponsored by Grameenphone. International music artistes like Tunde Jegede, Dele Sosimi, Julia Biel and others along with local stars like Ajob, Porobashi, Band Lalon, Shah Jahan Munshi, Rob Fakir and others performed in this mega event. The Festival ended with a grand finale where all eight bands came together on the stage. The event proved to be huge success with being observed ardently by the passionate music lovers in Bangladesh.

References 

World music festivals
Cultural festivals in Dhaka
Music festivals in Bangladesh